Cilley is a surname. Notable people with the surname include:

Bradbury Cilley (1760–1831), United States Representative from New Hampshire
Clinton A. Cilley (1837–1900), North Carolina lawyer and judge, and a recipient of the Medal of Honor
Jacalyn Cilley, Democratic member of the New Hampshire Senate, representing the 6th District since 2006
Jonathan Cilley (1802–1838), member of the U.S. House of Representatives from Maine
José Cilley (born 1972), Argentine rugby union footballer
Joseph Cilley (senator) (1791–1887), United States Senator from New Hampshire
Joseph Cilley (state senator) (1734–1799), New Hampshire state senator and general
Noble Cilley Powell, also known as Noble C. Powell, (1891–1968), leader in the Episcopal Church in the USA

See also
Cilley Hall, dormitory at Phillips Exeter Academy in Exeter, New Hampshire, United States, named after Bradbury Cilley
Chilly (disambiguation)
Scilly
Sillery (disambiguation)